Laser Squad is a turn-based tactics video game, originally released for the ZX Spectrum and later for the Commodore 64, Amstrad CPC, MSX, Amiga, Sharp MZ-800 and Atari ST and PC computers between 1988 and 1992. It was designed by Julian Gollop and his team at Target Games (later Mythos Games and Codo Technologies) and published by Blade Software, expanding on the ideas applied in their previous Rebelstar series of games.

Laser Squad originally came with five mission scenarios, with an expansion pack released for the 8-bit versions, containing a further two scenarios. Reaction from gaming magazines was positive, gaining it high review rating and several accolades.

The legacy of the game can be seen in other titles like the X-COM series, especially the acclaimed X-COM: UFO Defense which was also created by Julian Gollop and was initially conceived as a sequel to Laser Squad.

Gameplay

Laser Squad is a turn-based tactics war game where the player completes objectives such as rescue or retrieval operations, or simply eliminating all of the enemy by taking advantage of cover, squad level military tactics, and careful use of weaponry. The squad's team members are maneuvered around a map one at a time, taking actions such as move, turn, shoot, pick up and so on that use up the unit's action points. More heavily laden units may tire more easily, and may have to rest to avoid running out of action points more quickly in subsequent turns. Morale also plays a factor; a unit witnessing the deaths of his teammates can panic and run out of the player's control.

The original Target Games 8-bit release came with the first three missions with an expansion pack offered via mail order for the next two. The subsequent Blade Software 8-bit release included these as standard; the mail order expansion pack now offered was for missions six and seven instead. Both offers covered cassette and floppy disk versions. As well as featuring new scenarios, the expansion packs included additional weapons as part of the scenarios.

Including the expansion pack, there are seven scenarios in total, each one with its own difficulty settings and squad allocation: 

"The Assassins" - The mission's objective is to assassinate weapons manufacturer Sterner Regnix. The player will lead a small squad of troops on an infiltration mission, dealing with droid patrols.
"Moonbase Assault" - A small squad must penetrate the Omni Corporation moon base, via the airlocks, and destroy their computer systems.
"Rescue from the Mines" - After a routine mission goes badly wrong, three members of a squad are held prisoner in the Metallix Corp mines. A squad of troops must negotiate the mine complex, free all three prisoners and escape.
"The Cyber Hordes" - A small squad must defend a station from the attack of an advancing droid squad invasion. The base holds seven stabilizer cores vital to the planet's stability and the droids have focused their efforts on these targets.
"Paradise Valley" - Following on from "The Cyber Hordes", the destruction of the stabilizer cores has left the colony in ruins and assault ships hover above waiting for the time of attack. To prevent capture of the blueprints for an advanced starfighter, the data has been transferred onto a portable security device and a squad is given the task of escaping from the colony with the device.
"The Stardrive" - A group of mercenaries have captured a stardrive controller. A squad must go to their hidden base and retrieve the device.
"Laser Platoon" - A free for all deathmatch as equal teams are pitted against each other. Large (10-man) squads, with reinforcements arriving frequently, hunt down the equally equipped opposition.

Reception
Computer and Video Games, reviewing the original ZX Spectrum version, awarded it a near-perfect 97% score and a 'C+VG HIT!', stating that "Laser Squad is one of the hottest games I've ever played." Other Spectrum reviews included an 89% in Sinclair User, while Your Sinclair gave the game a 9/10, calling it "a sophisticated strategy wargame...on a par with Elite for thinking warmongers." The game was voted number 16 in the Your Sinclairs Readers' Top 100 Games of All Time.

The Commodore 64 version also fared well with CU Amiga-64 giving a 'CU Screen Star' award with a 92% rating. Zzap!64 gave the game a score of 83%, stating that the game was "an absorbing and very fresh approach to man-to-man combat." Amstrad Action awarded the CPC version with 91%  and an 'AA Mastergame' accolade. The Expansion Pack 2 received an even higher rating of 93% when it became available for review, as "two excellent additions to a game that was already excellent."

The Amiga version also received positive reviews. Amiga Format awarded a 'Gold Award' for a 93% rating explaining that it "is a terrific game that is superbly playable and can definitely be recommended." Other Amiga reviews given by Zero and CU Amiga-64 gave the game their scores of 88% and 87%, respectively. It was ranked the 25th best Amiga game ever by Amiga Power in 1991.

In 2004, readers of Retro Gamer voted Laser Squad as the 63rd top classic game.

Legacy
Rebelstar and Laser Squad are among the earliest examples of turn-based unit-level wargame video games. In 1990, Mythos Games released a fantasy game Lords of Chaos, which had many similarities to Laser Squad but was a follow-up to Gollop's earlier ZX Spectrum game Chaos: The Battle of Wizards. The Laser Squad franchise has been revived by Gollop's Codo Technologies in 2002 with the play-by-email game Laser Squad Nemesis, although this departs from the turn-based action point system and does not have customizable weaponry.

Many of the Laser Squad mechanics were re-used in the later X-COM series of games, created also by Gollop and Mythos Games but published by MicroProse. Notably, the first X-COM game, X-COM: UFO Defense, began its development as Laser Squad II. Some of the name choices for characters and organizations in the games of Mythos and Codo are a thread connecting all the Laser Squad and Rebelstar games. The cover art for XCOM: Enemy Unknown, Firaxis Games' and 2K Games' remake of X-COM: UFO Defense, pays homage to Laser Squad.

References

External links

Laser Squad at The Hall of Light (the Amiga version)
Laser Squad online remake, a remake of Laser Squad made in javascript so it runs in your browser
Laser Squad Flash game , the ZX Spectrum version available to play
Stellar Forces, a Laser Squad remake available to play on the Android platform

1988 video games
Amiga games
Amstrad CPC games
Atari ST games
Commodore 64 games
DOS games
Krisalis Software games
MSX games
Multiplayer hotseat games
Science fiction video games
Teque London games
Turn-based tactics video games
ZX Spectrum games
Video games developed in the United Kingdom
Video games scored by Matt Furniss
Multiplayer and single-player video games
Mythos Games games
MicroLeague games